The Schongau–Peißenberg railway is a railway line in Upper Bavaria, Germany.

References

External links 
 

Railway lines in Bavaria